José Antonio Martínez may refer to:

José Antonio Martínez Gil (born 1993), Spanish footballer
Antonio José Martínez (1793–1867), New Mexican priest, politician, and educator

See also
José Martínez (disambiguation)